Highland Park may refer to:

Places

Australia
Highland Park, Queensland, a suburb of Gold Coast City

Canada
Highland Park, Ottawa, Ontario
Highland Park, Calgary, Alberta

Hong Kong
Highland Park (Hong Kong), a housing estate in Kwai Chung, Hong Kong

New Zealand
Highland Park, New Zealand, a suburb of Auckland

United States

Cities and towns
Highland Park, Cochise County, Arizona
Highland Park, Yavapai County, Arizona
Highland Park, Florida
Highland Park, Illinois, city near Chicago
Highland Park, Michigan, city surrounded by Detroit
Highland Park, New Jersey, borough adjacent to Edison
Highland Park, Pennsylvania, in Mifflin County
Highland Park, Texas, an enclave town surrounded by Dallas
Highland Park, Wisconsin, an unincorporated community

Parks and neighborhoods

Highland Park, Alabama, a neighborhood in Birmingham, south of downtown
Highland Park, Los Angeles, California
Highland Park, Oakland, California
Highland Park (Denver), Colorado, listed on the NRHP in west Denver
Highland Park, subdivision now part of Virginia–Highland and Poncey–Highland neighborhoods of Atlanta, Georgia
New Highland Park, a park in Atlanta, Georgia
Highland Park, Louisville, Kentucky (once an independent city)
Highland Park (Boston), Massachusetts, a neighborhood and historic district also known as Fort Hill
Highland Park, Holyoke, Massachusetts, a neighborhood northeast of downtown Holyoke, Massachusetts
Highland Park, Saint Paul, Minnesota
Highland Park (Meridian, Mississippi), a National Historic Landmark
Highland Park (Brooklyn), New York
Captain Tilly Park, formerly Highland Park, Queens, New York
Highland Park (Rochester, New York)
Highland Park (Pittsburgh neighborhood) a neighborhood of Pittsburgh, Pennsylvania
Highland Park (Pittsburgh park), a park in Pittsburgh, Pennsylvania
Highland Park, Salt Lake City, Utah
Highland Park (Richmond), Virginia, a neighborhood in Richmond's Northside
Highland Park Historic District (disambiguation)

Facilities and structures
"Highland Park", the nickname for Hilltop Park, a defunct baseball venue in New York City
Highland Park distillery, a Scotch whisky distillery in Orkney
Highland Park High School (disambiguation), several high schools in the United States
Highland Park Junior High School, in Halifax, Nova Scotia

Other uses
Highland Park, a 2013 film
Highland Park parade shooting, a mass shooting that occurred during a 4th of July parade

See also

 
 Highland (disambiguation)